The  is an electric multiple unit (EMU) train type operated by the private railway operator Nankai Electric Railway in Japan since 2008.

Design
The 8000 series design was developed from the earlier 1000 series EMUs first introduced in 1992.

Operations
The 8000 series is used on Nankai Line commuter services singly or coupled with 12000 series EMUs on Southern Premium limited express services to provide non-reserved accommodation.

Formation
, the fleet consisted of thirteen four-car sets formed as follows with two motored (M) cars and two trailer (T) cars.

The two end cars are each fitted with one PT7144-B single-arm pantograph.

Interior

History
The first sets entered service in 2008.

Fleet history
The fleet history details are as shown below (data not available prior to 2013).

References

External links

 Nankai Electric Railway 8000 series (Japan Railfan Magazine) 

Electric multiple units of Japan
Train-related introductions in 2008
Nankai Electric Railway rolling stock
1500 V DC multiple units of Japan
Tokyu Car multiple units
J-TREC multiple units